Rhizangiidae is a family of stony corals in the order Scleractinia. This family is closely related to Oculinidae. Members of this family are non-reef building corals and reproduce from stolons. The corallites are small and the septa are simple.

Genera
The World Register of Marine Species includes the following genera in the family:

 †Arctangia Wells, 1937 
 Astrangia Milne Edwards & Haime, 1848
 Cladangia Milne Edwards & Haime, 1851
 Culicia  Dana, 1846
 Oulangia  Milne Edwards & Haime, 1848
 †Platyhelia Tenison-Woods, 1880 
 †Rhipidogyra  Milne Edwards & Haime, 1848
 †Rhizangia Milne Edwards & Haime, 1848 
 †Septastrea''  d'Orbigny, 1849

References

 
Taxa named by Alcide d'Orbigny
Scleractinia
Cnidarian families